In Europe may refer to:

In Europe (Thad Jones Mel Lewis Orchestra album), a live recording from two 1978 concerts in Poland and Germany
In Europe (Jack Walrath album), a 1982 album recorded in Copenhagen
In Europe (Elvin Jones album), a 1991 album recorded live in Germany
In Europe '82, a four-track EP by the American musician Meat Loaf

See also
Live in Europe (disambiguation)
In Europa (disambiguation)